Rumbaugh is a surname. Notable people with the surname include:

James Rumbaugh (born 1947), American computer scientist
Sue Savage-Rumbaugh (born 1946), American primatologist